This article has the list of Schedule Castes in Bihar.

List 
The table has 22 castes designated as Schedule Caste in Bihar as of their population as per 2011 Census.

References 

 
Lists of Scheduled Castes by state